KQZQ (98.3 FM) is a radio station licensed to serve the community of Kiowa, Kansas. The station is owned by My Town Media, Inc. It airs a country music format.

The station was assigned the KQZQ call letters by the Federal Communications Commission on February 27, 2008.

References

External links
 Official Website
 

QZQ
Country radio stations in the United States
Radio stations established in 2008
2008 establishments in Kansas
Barber County, Kansas